Hiripan was the third Cazonci of the Irechikwa Ts'intsuntsani in Mesoamerica, in what is now Mexico. He was the nephew of Tariácuri. It is unknown when his rule began, but it ended around ~1430.

References 
15th-century monarchs in North America
Purépecha people